The R134 road is a regional road in South Dublin, Ireland connecting the R110 (Naas Road) to the R120 (Lock Road).

The official definition of the R134 from the Roads Act 1993 (Classification of Regional Roads) Order 2012  reads:

R134: Nangor Road, Clondalkin, County Dublin

Between its junction with R110 at Naas Road and its junction with R113 at Fonthill Road South via New Nangor Road all in the county of South Dublin

and

between its junction with R113 at Fonthill Road South and its junction with R120 at Milltown via Nangor Road all in the county of South Dublin.

See also
Roads in Ireland
National primary road
National secondary road
Regional road

References

Regional roads in the Republic of Ireland
Roads in County Dublin